Off-site may refer to:

 Off-site data protection in data management
 Off-site art exhibit or off-site art show
 Off-site construction in building
 The Off-Site Source Recovery Project, a US radioactive materials recovery initiative